The Right Honourable the Lord Mayor of Sydney is the head of the Council of the City of Sydney, which is the local government area covering the central business district of Sydney in the State of New South Wales, Australia. The Lord Mayor has been directly elected since 1995, replacing the previous system of being internally elected annually by the Councillors, and serves a four-year term. The most recent election was held on 4 December 2021, at which the incumbent Lord Mayor, Clover Moore, was re-elected to a fifth term. The Lord Mayor is assisted in their work by a Deputy Lord Mayor, who is elected on an annual basis by the elected councillors.

Office history
The office of the Mayor of Sydney along with the City of Sydney was created on 20 July 1842 pursuant to the Sydney City Incorporation Act 1842 by Governor Sir George Gipps. Prior to the first municipal election, the governor nominated magistrate Charles Windeyer to serve as interim mayor. The first council, consisting of 24 aldermen elected across six wards, was declared elected on 3 November 1842 and first met in the George Street Market Building (now the site of the Queen Victoria Building) on 9 November and elected John Hosking as the first elected mayor of Sydney.

The title of Mayor (in full: The Right Worshipful the Mayor) was elevated to "Lord Mayor" on 23 November 1902 by King Edward VII, and as part of this process received the honorific The Right Honourable, a title which attaches to the title of Lord Mayor and not to the individual holding the office. In December 1915, the Parliament of New South Wales passed the Sydney Corporation (Election of Mayor) Act, 1915 which amended the 1902 act to allow for the governor to appoint the lord mayor should the council be unable to elect a candidate on or before 30 December of any year. This occurred three times, in 1916, 1920 and 1934.

The office of lord mayor, along with the City of Sydney, was governed by the Sydney Corporation Act, 1932 until the passing of the Local Government (Areas) Act 1948, which placed Sydney under the terms of the Local Government Act 1919, which governed all other local governments in the state. This meant that the election of lord mayor (until 1971 in December of each year, and then in September) marked the beginning of the term, instead of the previous system, where the lord mayoral term began on 1 January and expired on 31 December. When the City of Sydney Act 1988 was passed, the City of Sydney was once again governed under a separate law, but the election of lord mayor did not change until the Local Government Legislation Amendment Act 1995, which allowed for popular direct elections from 1995.

Vestments of office
As head of the council, the lord mayor is entitled to wear the chains and robes of office, as befitting the ancient status of lord mayor of a large city. In 1902 the Sydney Chamber of Commerce commissioned the first link of a mayoral chain. In 1903, the governor of New South Wales, Sir Harry Rawson presented the first lord mayor, Thomas Hughes, with the chain of office. It features the coat of arms of the Sydney Chamber of Commerce and the Stock Exchange and a pendant depicting the coat of arms of Sydney. Successive mayors each added a medallion, on which was embossed their term of office. By 1945, this practice had ended because of the size and weight of the chain. Today, the chain is worn with the robes of office only for rare civic ceremonies, a smaller collar being worn for most civic duties.

The original civic robe for the mayor of Sydney in 1842 was purple, trimmed with ermine and worn with a court dress hat. The current robes worn by the lord mayor and deputy lord mayor are black, trimmed with ermine, and worn with bicorne hat, lace jabot and white gloves. They are worn rarely and only at major civic functions. Recently, it has become the custom not to wear the robes.

List of mayors, lord mayors and administrators

List of deputy lord mayors
The position of Deputy Lord Mayor was made a permanent council position when the Local Government (Areas) Act 1948 placed the City of Sydney under the main body of local government legislation. Prior to 1 January 1949, "Deputy" Lord Mayors were occasionally elected to act for the council during times of absence or illness of a sitting Lord Mayor, but the position was not permanent under the Sydney Corporation Act 1932 or any previous acts. The following individuals have been elected as Deputy Lord Mayor of the City of Sydney:

List of town clerks, general managers, and chief executive officers
The first Town Clerk of Sydney was appointed on 3 September 1842 on a provisional basis by the Governor, pending the election of aldermen. When the council was dismissed in December 1853 and replaced by a board of three commissioners, the post of town clerk was left vacant. The Local Government Act, 1993 removed the requirement that the administrative head of a council be a "Town or Shire Clerk" and specified that the head was to be known as the General Manager. The Sydney City Council had previously recognised the changing nature of role in appointing their first General Manager in December 1992. In May 2005, the title of General Manager was changed to Chief Executive Officer (CEO).

Lord Mayoral electoral record
In 1995 the Local Government Legislation Amendment Act 1995 amended the City of Sydney Act 1988, to allow for popular direct elections of the Lord Mayor from September 1995. Here are the available results of each Lord Mayoral election since 1995:

References

External links
City of Sydney
Mayors of Sydney - City of Sydney
Sydney’s Aldermen - City of Sydney

 
 
Mayors Sydney
Sydney, Mayors
Mayors of Sydney